The Jardin botanique de la Font de Bézombes (2 hectares) is a private botanical garden located in Saint-André-de-Sangonis, Hérault, Languedoc-Roussillon, France. The garden contains three environments organized into seven sections: tropical, desert, swamp, Chinese, herbs, vegetables, and French garden. It is open on the first weekend of the warmer months; an admission fee is charged.

See also 
 List of botanical gardens in France

References 
 Jardins Languedoc entry (French)
 Saint Guilhem entry (French), with photographs
 Parcs et Jardins entry (French)
 Evene.fr entry (French)
 Culture.fr entry (French)

Gardens in Hérault
Botanical gardens in France